See Bauernfeind for the surname.
Bauerfeind AG is a German health care equipment company, one of the largest manufacturers of orthopaedic stockings and inserts in the world. Its headquarters are in Zeulenroda-Triebes, Thuringia. It is a family company, not listed on any stock exchange.

The company was founded in Zeulenroda in 1929 by Bruno Bauerfeind as a manufacturer of medical rubber stockings. In 1949 his son, Rudolf Bauerfeind, left Zeulenroda because of the policy of nationalisation in East Germany and rebuilt the company in western Germany, first in Darmstadt-Eberstadt and then in Kempen. Immediately after German reunification, in 1991, Hans B. Bauerfeind, grandson of the founder and chairman of the management board since 1976, returned Bauerfeind GmbH, as it then was, to Zeulenroda, buying a compression bandage manufacturer there and investing more than 100 million euros in a new production facility, a research centre and a new 57-metre headquarters building, the tallest new building constructed in Thuringia since reunification. The family-owned company became an Aktiengesellschaft in 2002.

Hans Bauerfeind has built up the company to an international group. There are currently approximately 2,000 employees, 800 of them in Zeulenroda, and subsidiaries in a number of countries, including Austria, France, Great Britain, Italy, Spain and the United States. 

Sales in 2015 were 203.7 million euros. 

The medical aids are therefore “made in Germany” and are partly made by hand. Dirk Nowitzki has been a worldwide brand ambassador for the company since January 2016.

It has developed computer applications such as software to model clients' legs in three dimensions for accurate fitting. For the 2004 Summer Olympics in Athens, Bauerfeind supplied not only compression stockings but 750 pairs of health shoes manufactured by their Berkemann subsidiary. Hans Bauerfeind himself holds more than 60 patents and in 2007 was awarded an honorary professorship by the Fachhochschule Münster for his and the company's role in the establishment of the course of study in technical orthopaedics at German technical universities and the company's extensive financial support for the programme at Münster. The company also participates in an international education programme and awards a prize of its own. Bauerfeind also owns the Bio-Seehotel in Zeulenroda, which has several times been named one of Germany's best conference hotels. It was created in 2006 as a further conversion of a conference centre which had been a Free German Trade Union Federation hotel.

References

External links
 Official site
 

Companies based in Thuringia
Medical technology companies of Germany
Manufacturing companies established in 1929
1949 establishments in West Germany
German companies established in 1929
German companies established in 1949